In science-fiction criticism, a Jonbar hinge or Jonbar point is the fictional concept of a crucial point of divergence between two outcomes, especially in time-travel stories. It is sometimes referred to as a Jon Bar hinge or change-point.

Origin
The phrase is derived from the Jack Williamson novel The Legion of Time (serialized 1938, collected 1952). It refers to one action from its character John Barr, whose picking up of one of two objects (a magnet or a pebble) is a major turning point in history: choosing one will lead to a utopian civilization named Jonbar, while the other to the tyranny of the state of Gyronchi.

This crucial moment (about which other characters are forewarned and must act), is thus a "Jonbar point" in the novel's timeline, a forking-place upon which hinges the rest of its history.

Background
Jonbar hinges often refer to small nondescript events that had an important effect on history, but time travel caused the outcome of the choice or event to be changed and to lead to a different future or to an alternate history. It can, however, refer to any kind of change in history without having to deal with time travel, as Paul Di Filippo used the term when he reviewed S. M. Stirling's In the Courts of the Crimson Kings. In Michael Chabon's The Yiddish Policemen's Union the jonbar hinge was the death of the main opponent to the passing of the King-Havenner Bill, which would have allowed Jewish refugees to settle in Alaska. The jonbar hinge in Bring the Jubilee, Ward Moore's 1953 novel of American Civil War alternate history, is Robert E. Lee's victory at the 1863 Battle of Gettysburg. 

The term is also used in describing an important upcoming event or decision, that humanity will need to make.

See also
 Alien space bats
 Butterfly effect
 Counterfactual history
 For Want of a Nail
 Point of divergence in alternate history

References

Alternate history
Narrative techniques
Science fiction terminology